Sardar Mosharraf Hossain is a Bangladesh Awami League politician and the former Member of Parliament of Dinajpur-9.

Career
Hossain was elected to parliament from Dinajpur-9 as a Bangladesh Awami League candidate in 1973.

Death
Hossain died on 24 September 2017 at M Abdur Rahim Medical College and Hospital in Dinajpur.

References

Awami League politicians
2017 deaths
1st Jatiya Sangsad members
20th-century Bengalis
21st-century Bengalis
People from Parbatipur Upazila